King of Baseball was a ceremonial title awarded annually from 1951 to 2019 by Minor League Baseball to recognize an individual for their longtime dedication and service to professional baseball. It was awarded during baseball's Winter Meetings and usually presented along with a crown and robe.

The title originated in a beauty pageant held in celebration of the 50th anniversary of Minor League Baseball in 1951. The first king was selected to accompany the winner, "Miss Golden Anniversary". The pageant was discarded after 1954, but crowning a king continued. The title was not issued in 2020 after the cancellation of the minor league season due to the COVID-19 pandemic. In 2021, Major League Baseball assumed control of the minor leagues. Subsequently, the committee responsible for the award chose to discontinue the honor.

Winners

References
Specific

General

Awards disestablished in 2021
Awards established in 1951
Minor league baseball trophies and awards